The 2015–16 season was Fulham's 118th professional season and second consecutive season in the Championship. Along with competing in the Championship, the club also participated in the FA Cup and League Cup. The season covers the period from 1 July 2015 to 30 June 2016.

Transfers

In

Loans in

Out

Loans out

Fixtures and Results

Friendlies

Pre-season friendlies
On 26 June 2015, Fulham announced their pre-season schedule.

In-season friendlies

Championship

Matches
On 17 June 2015, the fixtures for the forthcoming season were announced.

Results summary

Results by matchday

Football League Cup

On 16 June 2015, the first round draw was made, Fulham were drawn away against Wycombe Wanderers. Fulham were drawn at home against Sheffield United in the second round.

FA Cup

Competitions

Overall

Championship table

Squad statistics

Appearances & goals
Last updated 7 May 2016.

Players listed with no appearances have been in the matchday squad but only as unused substitutes.

|-
|colspan="12" style="text-align:center;" |Out on loan
|-

|-
|colspan="12" style="text-align:center;" |Left during season
|-

Top scorers
Includes all competitive matches. The list is sorted by squad number when total goals are equal.

Last updated 7 May 2016.

Disciplinary record
Includes all competitive matches. The list is sorted by shirt number.

|-
|colspan=17 style="text-align:center;" |Out on loan
|-

|-
|colspan=17 style="text-align:center;" |Now left club
|-

|-
|colspan=4|TOTALS
|79
|2
|2
|3
|0
|0
|2
|0
|0
|84
|2
|2
|

Suspensions

Footnotes and references

Footnotes

References

Fulham
Fulham F.C. seasons